Petros Bakoutsis (born 29 June 2001) is a Greek professional footballer who plays as a midfielder for Super League 2 club Irodotos.

References

2001 births
Living people
Greek footballers
Super League Greece players
Super League Greece 2 players
Second Professional Football League (Bulgaria) players
Aris Thessaloniki F.C. players
Olympiacos F.C. players
Almopos Aridea F.C. players
PFC Minyor Pernik players
Association football midfielders
Footballers from Thessaloniki
Greek expatriate sportspeople in Bulgaria
Greek expatriate footballers
Expatriate footballers in Bulgaria